The State Register of Heritage Places is maintained by the Heritage Council of Western Australia. , 149 places are heritage-listed in the City of Wanneroo, of which 34 are on the State Register of Heritage Places.

List
The Western Australian State Register of Heritage Places, lists the following 34 state registered places within the City of Wanneroo:

References

Wanneroo